Rosana Sullivan is an American director, storyboard artist, writer, and executive producer. Since 2011, she has worked for Pixar Animation Studios. In 2019 she wrote and directed her first animated short film, Kitbull, for which she received a nomination for the Academy Award for Best Animated Short Film at the 92nd Academy Awards.

Early life and education
Rosana Sullivan was born in Charleston, South Carolina, and grew up in Texas. She has one brother. When she was in high school at age 16, her father, a university professor of biology, accepted a new job at the University of San Francisco and the family relocated to the San Francisco Bay Area.

Sullivan initially studied for a career as a veterinarian, enrolling at the University of San Francisco as a biology major. In her junior year, she took a course in portrait painting to satisfy an art credit and realized that art was her real calling. She spent her senior year at USF in the fine arts program, graduating in 2007, and then attended the Academy of Art University in San Francisco, graduating in 2010.

Career
Sullivan worked as a lead character designer at Ooga Labs and a 2D artist at Kabam before joining Pixar Animation Studios in 2011. With Pixar, she has contributed to the 3D animated films Monsters University, The Good Dinosaur, Piper, and Incredibles 2. She was nominated for a 2015 Annie Award for outstanding achievement in storyboarding in an animated feature production for her work on The Good Dinosaur. In February 2019 she wrote and directed her first animated film, a nine-minute traditionally animated short called Kitbull, which is part of the SparkShorts series.

In April 2019 she published an autobiographical picture book, Mommy Sayang, describing the life of a girl and her mother in a Malaysian village. This story, along with others that she has written, was inspired by her mother's roots in Malaysia.

In January 2021, it was announced that she would direct a feature film for Pixar.

Filmography 

Sources:

Accolade(s)

Bibliography

References

External links

"Episode 012: Rosana Sullivan – Pixar Story Artist" (audio)
Pixar's Rosana Sullivan ’07 keeps 'finding ways to make art' (video)

American animators
American animated film directors
American film directors
American screenwriters
American women film directors
American women artists
Academy of Art University alumni
English-language film directors
University of San Francisco alumni
Pixar people
American women animators
Artists from South Carolina
Living people
Year of birth missing (living people)